33 (thirty-three) is the natural number following 32 and preceding 34.

In mathematics
33 is:

 the largest positive integer that cannot be expressed as a sum of different triangular numbers.
 the smallest odd repdigit that is not a prime number.
 the sum of the first four positive factorials. 
 the sum of the sum of the divisors of the first six positive integers.
 the sum of three cubes: 
 equal to the sum of the squares of the digits of its own square in bases 9, 16 and 31.
 For numbers greater than 1, this is a rare property to have in more than one base.

 the smallest integer such that it and the next two integers all have the same number of divisors.
 the first member of the first cluster of three semiprimes (33, 34, 35); the next such cluster is 85, 86, 87.
 the first double digit centered dodecahedral number.
 divisible by the number of prime numbers (11) below 33.
 a palindrome in both decimal and binary.

In science
The atomic number of arsenic.
 33 is, according to the Newton scale, the temperature at which water boils.
 A normal human spine has, on average, 33 vertebrae when the bones that form the coccyx are counted individually.

Astronomy
Messier object M33, a magnitude 7.0 galaxy in the constellation Triangulum, also known as the Triangulum Galaxy.
The New General Catalogue object NGC 33, a double star in the constellation Pisces
33 is the number of years that it takes for the Lunar phase to return to its original position in relation to the Solar calendar. A Lunar month (Synodic) contains 29.53 days. A twelve-month lunar year contains 354.36 days. A solar year (Tropical year) totals 365.24 days. The lunar year is therefore 10.88 days shorter than the 12-month solar year. As each year passes, the lunar month trails 10.88 days behind the solar year. On the turn of the 33rd year, the lunar month is approximately 359.04 days, close to one whole year behind the solar calendar from the original position measured, thus it has a 33-year cycle in relation to the solar year. The closest point at which the lunar and solar cycle meet are at 33 years and 33 weeks (calculated by dividing the 52 weeks of the 33rd year by 10.88 and multiplied by the remaining 7 day difference). Many cultures and civilisations have based their calendar on the lunar cycles including the Athenian Attic calendar and the Islamic Calendar, the Hijri calendar based on lunar observation.

In technology 
 In reference to gramophone records, 33 refers to a type of record by its revolution speed of  revolutions per minute. 33s are also known as long playing records, or LPs. See: 78 and 45
The ITU country code for the French telephone numbering plan area

In religion and mythology 
 The number of deities in the Vedic Religion is 33.
 The second level of heaven in Buddhism is named Trāyastriṃśa, meaning "of the 33 (gods)."
 The number of incarnations the bodhisattva Avalokiteśvara is said to embody
 The divine name Elohim appears 33 times in the story of creation in the opening chapters of Genesis.
 Lag Ba'omer is a minor Jewish holiday which falls on the 33rd day of the Omer
 Jesus' traditional age when he was crucified and resurrected.
 According to Al-Ghazali the dwellers of Heaven will exist eternally in a state of being age 33.
 Islamic prayer beads are generally arranged in sets of 33, corresponding to the widespread use of this number in dhikr rituals. Such beads may number 33 in total or three distinct sets of 33 for a total of 99, corresponding to the names of God.
 Pope John Paul I, the 33-day pope. One of the shortest reigns in papal history, and it resulted in the most recent three-pope year.
 A religious image of the Virgin Mary from the 18th century is known in Uruguay as "Virgen de los Treinta y Tres" (Virgin of the Thirty-Three); it was consecrated by Pope John Paul II in his visit to Uruguay in 1988.
 There are several churches dedicated to this Marian devotion, being the most important the Cathedral Basilica of Our Lady of the Thirty-Three in Florida, Uruguay.
 33 is a master number in New Age numerology, along with 11 and 22.
 There are 33 degrees in Scottish Rite Freemasonry
 The House of the Temple, Home of The Supreme Council, 33°, Ancient & Accepted Scottish Rite of Freemasonry in Washington D.C., US, has 33 outer columns which are each 33 feet high.
 The Saigoku Kannon Pilgrimage visits 33 Buddhist temples throughout the Kansai region of Japan.
 Rupes Nigra, a phantom island was described as having a circumference of 33 "French" miles.

In sports

 The number of innings played in the longest professional baseball game in history (a 1981 minor league game between the Rochester Red Wings and the Pawtucket Red Sox in Pawtucket, Rhode Island).
 In motorsport, 33 is the traditional number of racers in the Indianapolis 500.
 The Big 33 Football Classic is an annual postseason high school football all-star game that features top players from Pennsylvania. In recent years, the opposition has been an all-star team from Ohio. The number 33 represents the original number of players on each squad (now 34).
 FIBA 33 is the original name of the basketball variant now known as 3x3. It is a formalized version of half-court three-on-three basketball currently being heavily promoted by the sport's international governing body, FIBA. Under the original rules of FIBA 33, the game ended by rule once either team scored at least 33 points, with scoring following traditional basketball rules. 3x3 uses a substantially different scoring system.
 33 is the number of the longest winning streak in NBA History, which the Los Angeles Lakers achieved in the 1971–72 NBA Season
 World Snooker Championship semi-finals are played over 33 frames. The first rounds are played over 19 frames played in two sessions, the second round and quarter-finals played over 25 frames in three sessions, the semi-finals over 33 frames and the final over 35 frames, each played over four sessions.
 An extra point attempt in the NFL is 33 yards since 2015.

In media
 The number 33 is featured in Dark, a German science fiction television series following intertwined storylines over increments of 33 years.
 The 33 is a biographical disaster film based on the real events of a mining disaster that occurred in 2010, where a group of 33 miners became trapped inside the San José Mine in Chile.

In other fields 

Thirty-three is:
 The number printed on all Rolling Rock beer labels.
 Pabst Blue Ribbon Beer used to be advertised as "Blended 33 to 1".
 The name brand of a mass-market lager beer, "33" Export, brewed and distributed in West Africa.
 The namesake of the private club, Club 33, located in Disneyland's New Orleans Square.
 The number of workers trapped, all of whom were rescued, during the 2010 Copiapó mining accident.
 The 33 Orientales were a group of Uruguay's national Independence Heroes that liberate the country in 1825 from the Brazilian Empire, the name is due for the leaders all 33 Degree Masons (The Thirty-Three Orientals), one of Uruguay's national states and its capital city is named "Treinta y Tres" after them
 The modern Russian alphabet consists of 33 letters.
 Georgian is presently written in a 33-letter alphabet.

See also
 List of highways numbered 33

References

External links
 Prime Curios! 33 from the Prime Pages
 

Integers